Adam Byrnes (born 29 July 1981, Sydney, NSW) is an Australian immigration lawyer and principal at Visa & Citizenship Lawyers, an immigration law firm.  He was previously an Australian-born Russian international rugby union player.

Rugby career
Byrnes played rugby at Newington College (1987–99). He played club rugby for Eastern Suburbs Rugby Union in Sydney. Byrnes played for Leinster Rugby in the Celtic League and Heineken Cup for two seasons from 2005. Byrnes played for Sydney Fleet in the inaugural season of the Australian Rugby Championship in 2007. Byrnes played for the Queensland Reds in the Super Rugby Competition for two seasons from 2009. Byrnes then played for the Melbourne Rebels in the Super Rugby Competition for two seasons from 2011. Byrnes played in the 2011 Rugby World Cup for Russia against USA, Italy, Ireland and his country of birth, Australia. In mid-2012 Byrnes played his last game of rugby against Uruguay with his Russian comrades in the IRB Nations Cup. Byrnes's position was lock, his play was described as abrasive, and he was relied upon to be the team enforcer.

Business career
Byrnes completed his University studies after his rugby career and he is now an Australian immigration lawyer, and principal at Visa & Citizenship Lawyers.

Personal life
Byrnes is an avid fisherman. In 2011, Byrnes attended the wedding of Albert II, Prince of Monaco, and Charlene Wittstock.

References

External links
 
 

1981 births
21st-century Australian lawyers
Australian rugby union players
Australian people of Russian descent
Russian rugby union players
Russia international rugby union players
Rugby union locks
Queensland Reds players
Melbourne Rebels players
Leinster Rugby players
Living people
Rugby union players from Sydney
People educated at Newington College
Expatriate rugby union players in Ireland